These are the official results of the athletics competition at the 1986 Goodwill Games which took place between July 5 and 9, 1986, at the Moscow Olympic Stadium in Moscow, Soviet Union.

Most of the running events had so many entrants that several heats had to be held with the combined results deciding on the medals (the sole exception was women's 100 metres hurdles where both heats and the final were held). This caused some controversy as the Soviets entered some of their better athletes in a theoretically weaker heat, possibly to avoid direct competition with the best rivals. This proved effective in the men's 1500 metres where Pavel Yakovlev ran in the first heat virtually unobstructed and paced by his teammate and eventually recorded a better time than the winner of the more tactical second heat featuring most of the favorites.

Men's results

100 meters
July 9Wind:Heat 1: +0.4 m/s, Heat 2: +0.8 m/s

200 meters
July 7Wind:Heat 1: 0.0 m/s, Heat 2: +0.6 m/s

400 meters
July 7

800 meters
July 8

1500 meters
July 8

5000 meters
July 7

10,000 meters
July 9

Marathon
July 6

110 meters hurdles
July 6Wind:Heat 1: +0.9 m/s, Heat 2: ? m/s

400 meters hurdles
July 9

3000 meters steeplechase
July 8

4 x 100 meters relay
July 9

4 x 400 meters relay
July 8

20 kilometers walk
July 7

High jump
July 9

Pole vault
July 8

Long jump
July 6

Triple jump
July 9

Shot put
July 8

Discus throw
July 6

Hammer throw
July 9

Javelin throw
July 6

Decathlon
July 6–7

*Out of competition performance

Women's results

100 meters
July 6Wind: +0.2 m/s

200 meters
July 8Wind:Heat 2: +1.2 m/s

400 meters
July 9

800 meters
July 6

1500 meters
July 9

3000 meters
July 6

5000 meters
July 8

Marathon
July 5

100 meters hurdles

Heats – July 8Wind:Heat 1: +0.2 m/s, Heat 2: +0.4 m/s

Final – July 8Wind:+0.4 m/s

400 meters hurdles
July 7

4 x 100 meters relay
July 9

4 x 400 meters relay
July 8

10 kilometers walk
July 7

High jump
July 7

Long jump
July 7

Shot put
July 7

Discus throw
July 9

Javelin throw
July 8

Heptathlon
July 6–7

References

July 5 results
July 6 results 
July 7 results
July 8 results

1986
1986 in athletics (track and field)